Zaviyeh-ye Olya (also Romanized as Zāvīyeh-ye ‘Olyā, Zāvīeh-ye ‘Olyā, and Zaviyeh Olya; also known as Zāvīeh, Zāvīeh Yukari, and Zāvīyeh-ye Bālā) is a village in Chaldoran-e Shomali Rural District, in the Central District of Chaldoran County, West Azerbaijan Province, Iran. At the 2006 census, its population was 143, in 33 families.

References 

Populated places in Chaldoran County